Michael Moriarty (born April 5, 1941) is an American-Canadian actor and jazz musician. He received an Emmy Award and Golden Globe Award for his first acting role on American television as a Nazi SS officer in the 1978 mini-series Holocaust as well as a Tony Award in 1974 for his performance in the play Find Your Way Home. He played Executive Assistant District Attorney Benjamin Stone for the first four seasons (1990–1994) of the television show Law & Order. Moriarty is also known for his roles in films such as Bang the Drum Slowly, Who'll Stop the Rain, Q: The Winged Serpent, The Stuff, Pale Rider, Troll, Courage Under Fire, and Shiloh.

Early life
Michael Moriarty was born in Detroit, Michigan, on April 5, 1941. He is the son of Eleanor (née Paul) and George Moriarty, a surgeon. His grandfather George Moriarty was a third baseman, umpire and manager in major league baseball for nearly 40 years.

Moriarty attended middle school at Cranbrook School in Bloomfield Hills before transferring to the University of Detroit Jesuit High School, graduating in 1959. He then matriculated at Dartmouth College, where he was a theatre college major, in the class of 1963. After receiving his Bachelor of Arts degree, he left for London, England, where he enrolled in the London Academy of Music and Dramatic Art (LAMDA), having received a Fulbright Scholarship.

Acting career
Before gaining fame in films, Moriarty worked for several years as an actor at the Guthrie Theater in Minneapolis. In 1973, Moriarty was cast as the egocentric Henry Wiggen in Bang the Drum Slowly opposite Robert De Niro as a slow-witted catcher who becomes terminally ill. In the same year, Moriarty starred in a TV movie adaptation of Tennessee Williams' The Glass Menagerie with Katharine Hepburn. Coincidentally, the film also featured Sam Waterston, who later replaced Moriarty as the Executive Assistant District Attorney on Law & Order. Moriarty's role in The Glass Menagerie (as "Jim," the Gentleman Caller; Waterston played the son "Tom") won him an Emmy Award for Best Supporting Actor. In 1974, Moriarty starred as rookie detective Bo Lockley in the acclaimed police drama Report to the Commissioner.

Moriarty won a Tony Award in 1974 for his performance in the play Find Your Way Home. His career on the screen was slow to develop while his theatre career was flourishing. He starred as the German SS officer Erik Dorf in the television miniseries Holocaust, which earned him another Emmy. Through the 1980s, Moriarty starred in such Larry Cohen movies as Q, The Stuff, It's Alive III: Island of the Alive, and A Return to Salem's Lot (much later, he appeared in Cohen's Masters of Horror episode "Pick Me Up"), as well as in Clint Eastwood's Pale Rider and The Hanoi Hilton. In 1986, he starred in the fantasy science fiction movie Troll, playing the role of Harry Potter Sr. (unrelated to the Harry Potter series).

In 1989, Moriarty starred in the HBO production Tailspin: Behind the Korean Airliner Tragedy, which dramatized the Soviet Union's shoot-down of Korean Air Lines flight 007 in 1983. He portrayed U.S. Air Force Major Hank Daniels, who was largely ignored (if not ridiculed) for showing how the ill-fated airliner had strayed off course into air space known by the Soviets to be used by U.S. Air Force electronic surveillance planes as they approached Soviet air space.

From 1990 to 1994, Moriarty starred as Ben Stone on Law & Order. He left the show in 1994, alleging that his departure was a result of his threatening a lawsuit against then-Attorney General Janet Reno, who had cited Law & Order as offensively violent. Moriarty criticized Reno's comment and claimed that she wanted to censor not only shows like Law & Order but also such fare as Murder, She Wrote. He later accused Law & Order executive producer Dick Wolf of not taking his concerns seriously and claimed that Wolf and other network executives were "caving in" to Reno's "demands" on the issue of TV violence. On September 20, 1994, on The Howard Stern Show, he made an offer to NBC, claiming that he would return to his role on the show if Dick Wolf was fired. Moriarty published a full-page advertisement in a Hollywood trade magazine calling upon fellow artists to stand up with him against attempts to censor TV show content. He subsequently wrote and published The Gift of Stern Angels, his account of this time in his life. In the fictional Law & Order universe, the Ben Stone character resigns from the D.A.'s office in 1994 after a witness in one of his cases is murdered. The February 7, 2018, episode of Law & Order: Special Victims Unit shows Sam Waterston's character, Jack McCoy, delivering a eulogy at Stone's funeral.

Wolf and others working on Law & Order tell a different story, however. On November 18, 1993, Moriarty and Wolf, along with other television executives, met with Reno to dissuade her from supporting any law that would censor the show. Wolf said that Moriarty overreacted to any effect the law was likely to have on the show. Law & Order producers claim they were forced to remove Moriarty from the series because of "erratic behavior," an example of which reportedly happened during the filming of the episode "Breeder" when, according to the episode's director Arthur Forney, Moriarty was unable to deliver his lines with a straight face. Series and network officials deny any connection between his departure and Janet Reno. Wolf also denies that the show has become less violent, graphic or controversial since 1994.

Moriarty acted in The Last Detail, Courage Under Fire, Along Came a Spider, Shiloh, Emily of New Moon and James Dean, for which he won his third Emmy. In 2007 he debuted his first feature-length film as screenwriter and performed the role of a man who thinks he is Adolf Hitler in Hitler Meets Christ.

Musical career
In addition to his acting career, Moriarty is a semi-professional jazz pianist and singer as well as a classical composer. He has recorded three jazz albums (though the first, Reaching Out, went unreleased). He has regularly performed live in both New York City and Vancouver with a jazz trio and quintet. In a 1990 concert review, New York Times reviewer Stephen Holden called Moriarty "a jazz pianist of considerable skill, an oddball singer with more than one vocal personality, and a writer of eccentric, jivey jazz songs."

Politics
Moriarty is politically active, describing himself as a "centrist" and sometimes as a "realist".

Moriarty announced his intention to run for the presidency in 2008 in an interview in the November 2005 issue of Northwest Jazz Profile, but he never formally declared his candidacy. He later endorsed fellow former Law & Order actor Fred Thompson for the presidency during the 2008 Republican primaries, as well as Carly Fiorina during the 2016 primary election cycle. He has been a frequent contributor of numerous political columns to the Enter Stage Right online Journal of Conservatism.

Personal life
Shortly after leaving Law & Order, Moriarty moved to Canada, declaring himself a political exile. He lived for a time in Halifax, Nova Scotia, where he was granted Canadian citizenship, and Toronto before settling in Vancouver.

In 2006, in the blog Enter Stage Right Moriarty wrote that he was a "very bad drunk" but as of 2004 had been sober for two years.

Filmography

Film

Television

References

External links
 
 
 Michael Moriarty at the Internet Off-Broadway Database
 
 
Yahoo Movies: Michael Moriarty
Michael Moriarty UUU fan site (via archive.org): includes semi-regular blog posts by Moriarty
Michael Moriarty (Aveleyman)

1941 births
Living people
20th-century American male actors
20th-century American male musicians
20th-century American pianists
21st-century American male actors
21st-century American male musicians
21st-century American pianists
Alumni of the London Academy of Music and Dramatic Art
American bloggers
American emigrants to Canada
American jazz pianists
American male bloggers
American male film actors
American male jazz musicians
American male pianists
American male television actors
Best Drama Actor Golden Globe (television) winners
Dartmouth College alumni
Jazz musicians from Michigan
Jazz musicians from New York (state)
Male actors from Detroit
Michigan Republicans
Musicians from Detroit
Naturalized citizens of Canada
Outstanding Performance by a Lead Actor in a Miniseries or Movie Primetime Emmy Award winners
Outstanding Performance by a Supporting Actor in a Drama Series Primetime Emmy Award winners
Outstanding Performance by a Supporting Actor in a Miniseries or Movie Primetime Emmy Award winners
Tony Award winners
University of Detroit Jesuit High School and Academy alumni
Fulbright alumni